The following is a list of episodes of the anime television series Aria, adapted from the science fiction manga series Aqua and Aria by Kozue Amano. Set in the early 24th century on a terraformed Mars, now called Aqua, it depicts the life of a young woman named Akari as a trainee gondolier tour guide, or undine, for Aria Company, including her friendships with her mentor, Alicia, and two other trainees, Aika and Alice.

The anime was produced by Hal Film Maker as a 54-episode television series comprising two seasons, an original video animation (OVA), and a third season. The series was directed by Jun'ichi Satō with character designs by Makoto Koga, and aired on TV Tokyo and TXN-affiliated stations between 2005 and 2008. All three seasons have been released on DVD in Japan. A new OVA, called Aria the Avvenire, was released in the 10th anniversary Blu-Ray Box sets of the anime series between 24 December 2015 and 24 June 2016.

Aria is licensed in English in North America by The Right Stuf International, subtitled DVD box sets of all seasons were released between 30 September 2008 and 16 March 2010 under its Nozomi Entertainment. The first two seasons plus the OVA were broadcast in Korea by Animax. The OVA and the third season are licensed in French by Kaze; episodes of the subtitled third season, Aria the Origination, was first broadcast by video on demand (VOD) starting on 2 June 2008, and a DVD box set was released on 28 November 2008. The first season was released on DVD in Taiwan by Muse Communications. All three seasons are licensed in Italy by Yamato Video, and the first season was broadcast on the RAI satellite channel SmashGirls in 2009.

Episodes

Aria the Animation (season 1)

The first season of Aria consisted of 13 episodes broadcast on TV Tokyo Network stations from 6 October 2005 to 29 December 2005. Nino. The logo for this season is colored deep blue. The episodes were released in Japan on six DVDs between 25 January 2006 and 23 June 2006. A DVD season box set was released on 25 March 2009. 

In North America, a DVD box set of English subtitled episodes was released on 30 September 2008 by The Right Stuf International under its Nozomi Entertainment imprint. In Taiwan, the series was released by Muse Communications in six DVDs subtitled in Chinese. In Korea, dubbed episodes were broadcast in 2006 by Animax, where it was the 6th most popular animated show broadcast that year. In Italy, the series is licensed by Yamato Video and dubbed episodes were broadcast on the RAI satellite channel SmashGirls starting 20 June 2009.

Aria the Natural (season 2)
The second season of Aria of 26 episodes was broadcast on TV Tokyo Network stations and AT-X from 2 April 2006 to 24 September 2006. The production staff remained mostly unchanged from the first season. Nino for episodes 1–15, "Smile Again" by Erino Hazuki for episodes 16–25, and "Rainbow"  by Round Table feat. Nino for episode 26. The logo for this season is colored aqua. The episodes were released in Japan on 9 DVDs from 25 July 2006 to 23 March 2007; a DVD season box set was released on 25 November 2009.

In North America, the season was released in two box sets of subtitled episodes by The Right Stuf International under its Nozomi Entertainment imprint on 29 January and 24 March 2009. The season was broadcast in dubbed episodes in Korea by Animax. In Italy, the series is licensed Yamato Video.

Aria the OVA: Arietta
A single-episode OVA titled Aria the OVA: Arietta was released 21 September 2007 and broadcast on AT-X on 2 September 2007. The script was written by director Jun'ichi Satō. It is 30 minutes in length. The logo for the OVA is colored orange.

A dubbed version of the OVA was broadcast in Korea by Animax on 24 December 2007. In France, Kaze is scheduled to release the OVA as promotional material for the publication of volume 8 of the Aria manga. In North America, it was released as part of the season box set of Aria the Origination by The Right Stuf International under its Nozomi Entertainment imprint on 16 March 2010.

Aria the Origination (season 3)
The third season of Aria of 13 episodes was broadcast on TV Tokyo Network stations and AT-X from 7 January 2008 to 31 March 2008, plus a bonus episode released only on DVD. The production staff remained largely unchanged from previous seasons. The logo for this season is colored violet. The episodes were released in Japan on seven DVDs between 25 April 2008 and 24 October 2008, along with a "Special Navigation" OVA, numbered as episode 5.5, which used  by Akino Arai as its ending theme.

In France, Kaze began broadcasting subtitled episodes of the third season on 2 June 2008 through Video on Demand, and released DVD box set on 26 November 2008. In North America, was released as a season box set of subtitled episodes by The Right Stuf International under its Nozomi Entertainment imprint on 16 March 2010. In Italy, the series is licensed by Yamato Video.

Aria the Avvenire
3 episodes

New Aria work produced for the "Ao no Curtain Call" project to celebrate the 10th anniversary of the broadcast of the first Aria TV series.

See also 
 List of Aria chapters
 List of Aria soundtracks

References

External links 
 Aria Company official anime website 
 TV Tokyo official anime website 
 Animate special Aria The Origination coverage 
 The Right Stuf official anime website
 

Aria